The Beechcraft Denali, also known as the Model 220 and previously the Cessna Denali and Textron "Single Engine Turboprop" (SETP), is an American single engine turboprop aircraft under development by Textron Aviation. Announced at EAA AirVenture Oshkosh 2015, the aircraft is a completely new design, not derived from any existing aircraft. It should compete with the Pilatus PC-12 and Daher-Socata TBM, as well as other new projects such as the One Aviation Kestrel K-350 and the CAIGA Primus 150.

Development
In November 2015, GE Aviation announced its General Electric Advanced Turboprop (ATP) (now General Electric Catalyst) had been selected to power the aircraft.
On 23 May 2016 Textron announced the SETP performance and cabin details.
At the 2016 AirVenture in Oshkosh, Wisconsin, the project was named Cessna Denali. In May 2017, after testing with a fuel system ground testing rig and the propeller, Textron announced it had started building static and fatigue test articles, including the aft cargo door. Flight testing was to begin in the third quarter of 2018, followed by certification in 2019.

In February 2018, assembly of the first prototype was underway in Wichita, for a first flight scheduled to occur before the end of the year. By then, its unit cost was $4.8 million and service entry was scheduled for 2020.

In May 2018 ground tests continued and all major components were being fabricated, including the nose, fuselage, wings and the tail cone.

Three flying prototypes were being completed for an intended first flight scheduled for early 2019.

By October 2018, the first prototypes fuselages and flight controls were nearly complete, and wings were starting to be constructed, towards a 2020 certification.
By October 2019, the first flight was pushed back by GE Catalyst testing delays, with Textron expecting its first turboprop in 2020.

By July 2021, the turboprop engine was to have its maiden flight in a King Air 350 testbed aircraft in the coming months, for engine certification by end-2022.
A Catalyst engine was installed on a Denali airframe to make its first flight before year-end and to achieve aircraft certification in 2023.

On November 23, 2021, the Denali made its first flight from Textron Aviation's facilities in Wichita, Kansas. The 2-hour and 50-minute flight reached  and an altitude of 15,600 feet. The certification program will use two additional flight prototypes and three ground test airframes. The second prototype first flew in mid-June 2022 and joined the test program.

In 2022, its equipped price was estimated at $6M and forecast to be $6.3M in 2024.

Design

Cabin altitude at  should be . Its cabin is 58×63 in (147×160 cm) tall and wide with a flat floor, 3 inches (7.6 cm) wider than its closest competitor; the 59×53 in (150×135 cm) tall by wide cargo door is larger than the PC-12's 53×52 in (135×132 cm) door.

Metal bonding makes the wings more resistant to fuel leaks and automatic drilling saves some labor. The cabin is precisely mated to other structures thanks to routing and pin-locating tools. To lower the number of holes and fasteners needed, large parts like the wing spar and main doors are monolithically machined from a single aluminum billet, or chemically milled like the titanium firewall.

Specifications

See also

References

External links
 

Denali
Proposed aircraft of the United States
Single-engined tractor aircraft
Single-engined turboprop aircraft
T-tail aircraft
Low-wing aircraft
Aircraft first flown in 2021